Njattyela Sreedharan (born in 1938) is a lexicographer from Thalassery in Kerala. He is known for compiling a dictionary connecting four major Dravidian languages Malayalam, Kannada, Tamil and Telugu.

Selected books
Malayalam-Tamil Dictionary (2012)
Chathur Dravida Bhasha Nighandu (Dictionary of Four Dravidian Languages) (2020)

In Popular culture 
The 2021 documentary Dreaming of Words, directed by Indian  filmmaker Nandan, celebrates the life and work of Njattyela Sreedharan. Dreaming of Words has received numerous accolades including a National Film Award and was screened at the annual convention of the Modern Language Association and the annual conference of the Linguistic Society of America in January 2022.

Major awards
 Dr. Hermann Gundert Award for the best dictionary (2022) instituted by Dravidian Linguistics Association

See also
Multilingualism
Sreekanteswaram Padmanabha Pillai
Hermann Gundert
Dreaming of Words

References

External links
 
 Dreaming of Words | Official Trailer on YouTube
 Dreaming of Words | Full Documentary on YouTube

20th-century Indian linguists
Linguists from India
Indian lexicographers
Multilingualism